The Seed of Discord is a 2008 Italian film.
The film is a modernisation of Heinrich von Kleist's novel The Marquise of O. It was entered into the main competition at the 65th Venice International Film Festival.

Plot 

A married and faithful Italian woman finds herself pregnant the same day her husband is discovered to be sterile.
In the original sound track is included a famous song of Sixties: the Mina's version of Canta Ragazzina

Cast 
 Caterina Murino – Veronica
 Alessandro Gassman – Mario
 Martina Stella – Nike
 Valeria Fabrizi – Veronica's mother
 Michele Venitucci – Gabriele
 Angelo Infanti – Veronica's father
 Lucilla Agosti – Dancer
 Iaia Forte – Lover
 Monica Guerritore – Doctor
 Rosalia Porcaro – Lover
 Isabella Ferrari – Monica
 Eleonora Pedron – Gabriele's girlfriend

Production
Caterina Murino said it was very difficult for her to play the shower scene. "I wanted my body completely covered in foam, of all kinds, whipped with a whisk to make it more solid and water resistant but eventually there is little left of it".

References

External links 
 
 
 Trailer on YouTube

2008 films
Films based on works by Heinrich von Kleist
Italian comedy films
2000s Italian-language films
Films directed by Pappi Corsicato
2000s Italian films
Italian pregnancy films